Aedes scutellaris is a mosquito found in Ambon, Aru Islands, Seram, New Guinea. It is a vector for the dengue virus.

References

scutellaris
Insects described in 1859
Dengue fever